Carmine Nicolao Caracciolo, 5th Prince of Santo Buono, Grandee of Spain (July 5, 1671, Bucchianico, Naples – July 26, 1726, Madrid) was Spanish Viceroy of Peru from October 5, 1716 to January 26, 1720.

Biography  
His name was spelt several different ways, including Carmine Nicola Caracciolo, Carmine Niccolo Caracciolo, Carmine Nicolás Caracciolo and Carmino Nicolás Caracciolo.

Born in 1671 in Bucchianico, Naples, his parents were Marino V Caracciolo, 4th Prince of Santo Buono, and his wife, Donna Giovanna Caracciolo dei Principi di Torella (both were members of the Caracciolo family by birth).

Carmine Caracciolo was a descendant of an old noble family of Naples and was a prince of the Holy Roman Empire. When his father died in 1694, he succeeded him as Prince of Santo Buono, Duke of Castel di Sangro, Marquis of Buccianico and several other titles. A cultured man of letters, he married Donna Giovanna Costanza Ruffo dei Duchi di Bagnara next year.

A supporter of the House of Bourbon, Naples send him to pay homage to King Philip V in 1701. Next year, the king appointed him ambassador extraordinary to Rome and created him Grandee of Spain. In 1704, Caracciolo passed to Venice as ordinary ambassador, a post he performed until 1711. 

In 1707, when Naples passed to the Crown of Austria, his property in this country was confiscated. In 1711, he moved to Madrid. Philip V appointed him Viceroy of Peru in 1713 to replace the Marquis of Castelldosrius although he delayed some time in traveling to America. In 1715, he embarked from Cadiz to Peru with his family and a court, but unfortunately his wife died during the travel giving birth to one of his sons.

He arrived in Cartagena de Indias on the warships of the Count of Vega Florida and entered Lima on October 5, 1716. In celebration of his arrival, the poet Pedro de Peralta Barnuevo published a panegyric in his honor, as did Bermúdez de la Torre, "El sol en el zodíaco". Soon, Caracciolo became aware of the corruption in the politics and commerce of the viceroyalty. He brought with him orders from the Crown to end the French contraband, something that had been protected and encouraged by his immediate predecessors.

In 1717 the Viceroyalty of New Granada was created in northern Peru, from the Audiencias of Bogotá, Quito and Panamá. However this establishment lasted only until 1724, when the territories were returned to the Viceroyalty of Peru. (The Viceroyalty of New Grenada was reestablished on a more permanent basis in 1734.)

Among the notable events of his administration were the following. He was unable to halt the contraband. During his administration missionaries made many converts in the mountains, and the College of Ocopa was founded. An epidemic affected 60,000 of the Indigenous. A royal order prohibited the branding of black slaves. Because of abuse by encomenderos of the system of mita, Caracciolo solicited its abolition. However, the king did not act on his recommendations.

On August 15, 1719 the first total eclipse of the sun recorded in Lima since the Spanish conquest occurred, just before noon. It was necessary to light house lights, and the eclipse inspired processions of penitents.

He served as viceroy until 1720. He died in Madrid, on July 26, 1726.

Notes

References
 Short biography
 A little more information
 The establishment of New Grenada

1671 births
1727 deaths
Viceroys of Peru
Grandees of Spain
Carmine